Gareth Jason Harte (born 15 March 1993) is a South African-born English cricketer. He made his Twenty20 cricket debut for Durham in the 2017 NatWest t20 Blast on 23 July 2017. He made his first-class debut for Durham in the 2018 County Championship on 20 April 2018. He made his List A debut for Durham in the 2018 Royal London One-Day Cup on 25 May 2018.

References

External links
 

1993 births
Living people
English cricketers
South African cricketers
Durham cricketers
Cricketers from Johannesburg
South African emigrants to the United Kingdom